Jack Diamond may refer to:

Jack Diamond (architect) (born 1932), Canadian architect
Jack Diamond (Canadian businessman) (1909–2001), Canadian businessman and philanthropist
Jack Diamond (gangster) (1897–1931), Irish-American gangster in Philadelphia and New York City during the Prohibition era
Jack Diamond (radio personality), American radio personality
Jack Diamond (comedian) (born 1941), British comedy entertainer
Jack Diamond, Baron Diamond (1907–2004), British politician and peer
Jack Diamond (footballer, born 1910) (1910–1961), English footballer
Jack Diamond (footballer, born 2000), English footballer

See also
Diamond Jack (disambiguation)
Jack of Diamonds (disambiguation)
John Diamond (disambiguation)